The FA Cup 1951–52 is the 71st season of the world's oldest football knockout competition; The Football Association Challenge Cup, or FA Cup for short. The large number of clubs entering the tournament from lower down the English football league system meant that the competition started with a number of preliminary and qualifying rounds. The 30 victorious teams from the Fourth Round Qualifying progressed to the First Round Proper.

Preliminary round

Ties

Replays

2nd replay

1st qualifying round

Ties

Replays

2nd replay

2nd qualifying round

Ties

Replays

2nd replays

3rd qualifying round

Ties

Replays

2nd replay

4th qualifying round
The teams that given byes to this round are New Brighton, Yeovil Town, Leytonstone, Cheltenham Town, Guildford City, Chelmsford City, Gainsborough Trinity, Stockton, Walthamstow Avenue, Dartford, Witton Albion, Weymouth, North Shields, Rhyl, Bromsgrove Rovers, Merthyr Tydfil, Hereford United, Grantham, Peterborough United, Scarborough, Ashington, Wigan Athletic, Nelson and Hendon.

Ties

Replays

2nd replay

1951–52 FA Cup
See 1951–52 FA Cup for details of the rounds from the First Round Proper onwards.

External links
 Football Club History Database: FA Cup 1951–52
 FA Cup Past Results

Qualifying
FA Cup qualifying rounds